Barlow/Max Bell station is a CTrain light rail station in Calgary, Alberta, Canada. It serves the Northeast Line (Route 202). It opened on April 27, 1985, as part of the original Northeast line.

The station is located in the median of Memorial Drive Southeast, near the intersection with 19 Street Northeast. The station is 3.9 km from the City Hall Interlocking.

The station serves areas located along Barlow Trail, such as Mayland with a 50 space parking lot available for commuters and  near the Max Bell Centre arena. 

The station's centre-loading (island) platform is accessed via ramps from a pedestrian tunnel under Memorial Drive. Barlow/Max Bell and Zoo are the only stations in the system that are constructed this way.

As part of Calgary Transit's plan to operate 4-car trains by the end of 2014, all 3-car platforms were extended, and Barlow/Max Bell station also received new furnishings in addition to a platform extension. Construction took place in 2014. 

In 2005, the station registered an average transit of 1,600 boardings per weekday.

References

External links
City of Calgary. Barlow/Max Bell LRT Station - information brochure

CTrain stations
Railway stations in Canada opened in 1985
1985 establishments in Alberta